"The Night They Drove Old Dixie Down" is a song written by Robbie Robertson and originally recorded by the Canadian-American roots rock group the Band in 1969 and released on their eponymous second album. Levon Helm provided the lead vocals. The song is a first-person narrative relating the economic and social distress experienced by the protagonist, a poor white Southerner, during the last year of the American Civil War, when George Stoneman was raiding southwest Virginia. The song appeared at number 245 on Rolling Stone magazine's list of the 500 greatest songs of all time.

Joan Baez's version peaked at #3 on the Hot 100 on 2 October 1971; it did likewise on the Cashbox Top 100 chart. However, on the Record World Top Singles chart for the week of September 25, 1971, the Baez single hit #1 for one week.

Creation and recordings
The song was written by Robbie Robertson, who spent about eight months working on it. Robertson said he had the music to the song in his head and would play the chords over and over on the piano but had no idea what the song was to be about. Then the concept came to him and he researched the subject with help from the Band's drummer Levon Helm, a native of Arkansas. In his 1993 autobiography, This Wheel's on Fire, Helm wrote, "Robbie and I worked on 'The Night They Drove Old Dixie Down' up in Woodstock. I remember taking him to the library so he could research the history and geography of the era and make General Robert E. Lee come out with all due respect."

The lyrics tell of the last days of the American Civil War, portraying the suffering of the protagonist, Virgil Caine, a poor white Southerner. Dixie is the historical nickname for the states making up the Confederate States of America. The song's opening stanza refers to one of George Stoneman's raids behind Confederate lines attacking the railroads of Danville, Virginia, at the end of the Civil War in 1865:

"The Night They Drove Old Dixie Down" is considered one of the highlights of The Band, the group's second album, which was released in the fall of 1969. According to Rob Bowman's liner notes to the 2000 reissue of The Band, the album has been viewed as a concept album, with the songs focusing on the peoples, places and traditions associated with an older version of Americana.

A highlight of the group's repertoire, it has been included in every compilation covering their recording career 1968 to 1977. The Band frequently performed the song in concert, and it is included on the group's live albums Rock of Ages (1972) and Before the Flood (1974). The song also was included in the Band's Thanksgiving Day concert in 1976 which was the subject of Martin Scorsese's documentary film The Last Waltz, and on that film's soundtrack released in 1978.

The last time the song was performed by Helm was in The Last Waltz. Helm refused to play the song afterwards. Although it has long been believed that the reason for Helm's refusal to play the song was a dispute with Robertson over songwriting credits, according to Garth Hudson the refusal was due to Helm's dislike for Joan Baez's version.

Reception
The song was number 245 on Rolling Stone magazine's list of the 500 greatest songs of all time. Pitchfork Media named it the forty-second best song of the 1960s. The song is included in the Rock and Roll Hall of Fame's "500 Songs that Shaped Rock and Roll" and Time magazine's All-Time 100.

Critic Ralph J. Gleason (in the review in Rolling Stone (U.S. edition only) of October 1969) explains why this song has such an impact on listeners:Nothing I have read … has brought home the overwhelming human sense of history that this song does. The only thing I can relate it to at all is The Red Badge of Courage. It's a remarkable song, the rhythmic structure, the voice of Levon and the bass line with the drum accents and then the heavy close harmony of Levon, Richard and Rick in the theme, make it seem impossible that this isn't some traditional material handed down from father to son straight from that winter of 1865 to today. It has that ring of truth and the whole aura of authenticity.

21st century political criticism
Some commentators in the 21st century have questioned whether the song's original lyrics made it an endorsement of slavery and the ideology of the Lost Cause of the Confederacy. In 2009, writing in The Atlantic, Ta-Nehisi Coates characterized the song as "another story about the blues of Pharaoh." In an August 2020 interview in Rolling Stone, contemporary singer-songwriter Early James described how he had started changing the lyrics of the song, while covering it, to oppose the Confederate cause — for example, in the first verse, "where Helm sang that the fall of the Confederacy was 'a time I remember oh so well,' James declared it 'a time to bid farewell," and he reworked the final verse to state "Unlike my father before me, who I will never understand... I think it's time we laid hate in its grave." An editorial in The Roanoke Times in 2020 argued that these views are based on a misunderstanding of the song, which does not glorify slavery, the Confederacy, or Robert E. Lee, but, rather, tells the story of a poor, non-slave-holding Southerner who tries to make sense of the loss of his brother and his livelihood. It notes that it was written, not by a Southerner, but by a Canadian, and contained factual errors. Jack Hamilton, of the University of Virginia, writing in Slate, said that it is "an anti-war song first and foremost", pointing to the references to "bells ringing" and "people singing" in the chorus.

Joan Baez version

The most successful version of the song was the one by Joan Baez, which became a RIAA-certified Gold record on 22 October 1971.  In addition to chart action on the Hot 100, the record spent five weeks atop the easy listening chart. Billboard ranked it as the No. 20 song for 1971.  The version reached number six in the pop charts in the UK in October 1971.

The Baez recording had some changes in the lyrics. Baez later told Rolling Stones Kurt Loder that she initially learned the song by listening to the recording on the Band's album, and had never seen the printed lyrics at the time she recorded it, and thus sang the lyrics as she had (mis)heard them. In more recent years in her concerts, Baez has performed the song as originally written by Robertson.

Chart performance

Weekly singles charts

Year-end charts

Certifications

Other versions
Johnny Cash recorded the song on his 1975 album John R. Cash. Old-time musician Jimmy Arnold recorded the song on his album Southern Soul, which was composed of songs associated with the Southern side of the Civil War. A fairly large-scale orchestrated version of the song appears on the 1971 concept album California '99 by Jimmie Haskell, with lead vocal by Jimmy Witherspoon. Others to record versions include Don Rich, Steve Young, John Denver, the Allman Brothers Band, Derek Warfield. the Charlie Daniels Band, Big Country, the Dave Brockie Experience, Vikki Carr, Richie Havens, the Black Crowes, Solomon Burke, Earl Thomas Conley, the Jerry Garcia Band, Sophie B. Hawkins, Legion of Mary, and the Zac Brown Band have included it on live albums. In 2008, Johnny Logan covered the song on his album, Irishman in America. Glen Hansard (of the Frames and the Swell Season), accompanied by Lisa Hannigan and John Smith, performed the song in July 2012 for The A.V. Club A.V. Undercover: Summer Break series.

The 1972 song "Am Tag als Conny Kramer starb" ("On the Day That Conny Kramer Died"), which uses the tune of the song, was a number-one hit in West Germany for singer Juliane Werding. The lyrics are about a young man dying because of his drug addiction. In 1986, the German band Die Goldenen Zitronen made a parody version of this song with the title "Am Tag als Thomas Anders starb" ("On the Day That Thomas Anders Died").

Personnel on the Band version
Levon Helm – lead vocals, drums
Rick Danko – bass guitar, backing vocals
Garth Hudson – melodica, slide trumpet
Richard Manuel – piano, backing vocals
Robbie Robertson – acoustic/electric guitar, backing vocals

See also
List of anti-war songs
List of number-one adult contemporary singles of 1971 (U.S.)
List of train songs

References

Further reading 

 Brooke Gladstone. Why Some Hear 'The Night They Drove Old Dixie Down' As A Neo-Confederate Anthem On the Media | WNYC. January 8, 2021.

External links 
 

The Band songs
Joan Baez songs
Songs written by Robbie Robertson
Songs based on American history
Musical compositions about the American Civil War
Southern United States in fiction
Songs about trains
Song recordings produced by John Simon (record producer)
Capitol Records singles
1971 singles
1969 songs
Songs about Virginia
Songs about nights
Vanguard Records singles
Race-related controversies in music
Lost Cause of the Confederacy
Cultural depictions of Robert E. Lee